Warrandyte South is a locality within Greater Melbourne, beyond the Melbourne Metropolitan Area Urban Growth Boundary, 25 km north-east of Melbourne's Central Business District, located within the City of Manningham local government area.

It is bounded in the west by Ringwood Road, in the north by Anzac Road, in the east by Jumping Creek and in the south by Old Warrandyte Road.

History
Warrandyte South State School Post Office opened in 1906, was renamed Warrandyte South in 1907 and closed in 1990.

See also
 City of Doncaster and Templestowe – Warrandyte South was previously within this former local government area.
 Shire of Lillydale – Warrandyte South was previously within this former local government area.

References

City of Manningham